Alfred Schuermans (born 1897, date of death unknown) was a Belgian painter. His work was part of the painting event in the art competition at the 1928 Summer Olympics.

References

1897 births
Year of death missing
20th-century Belgian painters
Olympic competitors in art competitions
Artists from Antwerp